Charlevoix was a federal electoral district in Quebec, Canada, that was represented in the House of Commons of Canada from 1867 to 1917 and from 1949 to 2004.

The district was created in the British North America Act of 1867. It was abolished in 1914 when it was merged into Charlevoix—Montmorency. The district was created again in 1947 from Charlevoix—Saguenay. It was abolished again in 2003 when it was redistributed into Charlevoix—Montmorency and Manicouagan ridings.

The best-known person to represent this riding is Brian Mulroney who was Member of Parliament for the riding, for part of his term as Prime Minister of Canada, from 1988 to 1993.

Members of Parliament

This riding elected the following members of the House of Commons of Canada:

Election results

See also 

 List of Canadian federal electoral districts
 Past Canadian electoral districts

External links

Riding history from the Library of Parliament
1867-1914
1947-2003

Former federal electoral districts of Quebec